The 1972–73 All-Ireland Senior Club Football Championship was the third staging of the All-Ireland Senior Club Football Championship since its establishment by the Gaelic Athletic Association in 1970-71.

Bellaghy were the defending champions, however, they failed to qualify after being beaten by Ballinascreen in the Derry County Championship.

On 24 June 1973, Nemo Rangers won the championship following a 4-16 to 0-10 defeat of St. Vincent's in the All-Ireland final replay at Semple Stadium. It was their first ever championship title.

Results

Connacht Senior Club Football Championship

Final

Leinster Senior Club Football Championship

First round

Quarter-finals

Semi-finals

Final

Munster Senior Club Football Championship

First round

Semi-finals

Final

Ulster Senior Club Football Championship

Final

All-Ireland Senior Club Football Championship

Semi-finals

Finals

Championship statistics

Miscellaneous

 St. Vincent's won the Leinster Club Championship for the first time in their history. They were also the first team from Dublin to win the provincial title.
 Clan na Gael won the Ulster Club Championship for the first time in their history. They were also the first team from Armagh to win the provincial title.
 The Central Council was spared some embarrassment when the All-Ireland final ended in a draw as there was no trophy available to be presented.

References

All-Ireland Senior Club Football Championship
1972 in Gaelic football
1973 in Gaelic football